Cabañas is a municipality in the Honduran department of Copán.

Municipalities of the Copán Department